Below is a list of the UNESCO World Heritage Sites located in upper North America. Greenland has been included here as part of North America despite its cultural and political associations with Europe. The separate List of World Heritage Sites in Central America covers the continental areas further south. Mexico leads North America hosting 35 sites, and is ranked seventh in the world.

World Heritage Sites

Legend

Endangered and trans-border sites

Additional information
Site: as per officially inscribed name
Location: at city, regional, or provincial level and geocoordinates
Criteria: as defined by the World Heritage Committee
Area: in hectares and acres; if available, the size of the buffer zone noted as well
Year: during which the site was inscribed to the World Heritage List
Description: brief information about the site, including reasons for qualifying as an endangered site, if applicable

List

See also
Lists of World Heritage Sites
List of World Heritage Sites in the United States

Notes

References
General

Notes

External links

UNESCO World Heritage Centre official website
UNESCO World Heritage List official website
VRheritage.org – documentation of World Heritage Sites
Worldheritage-Forum – Information and Weblog on World Heritage Issues

Americas

North America-related lists
World Heritage Sites